The Ashadeep Group of Schools is a group of private educational institutions in India, founded in 1997. The Ashadeep Group started its first school in Surat in 1997 and has seven schools located in Surat City in Gujarat state of India. 

Ashadeep Schools is in limelight for the last few years for their results in the Secondary School Certificate (SSC) examination for Standard 10 and the Higher Secondary (School) Certificate (HSC) examination for Standard XI-XII students taken by the Gujarat Secondary and Higher Secondary Education Board in Gujarat.

On the occasion of the 67th birthday of Indian Prime Minister Shri Narendra Modi, 3000 children of Ashadeep Schools united to form the face of Narendra Modi to wish him a 'Happy Birthday'.

Best
 2017 - 12 students of Class 12 from General Stream secured A1 grade in the Board Exam taken by GSHEB.
 2018 - 21 students of Class 12 from Science Stream secured A1 grade in the Board Exam taken by GSHEB.
 2018 - Student nacho secured the top rank of the GSHEB Class 10 exams by scoring 99 percent which is highest score in the history of GSHEB Results.
 2019 - 31 students of Class 12 from Science Stream secured A1 grade in the Board Exam taken by GSHEB.
 2019 - 64 students of Class 12 from General Stream secured A1 grade in the Board Exam taken by GSHEB.
2019 -  99 students of Class 10 secured A1 grade in the Board Exam taken by GSHEB.
 2020 - Seven students of Class 12 from Science Stream secured A1 grade in the Board Exam taken by GSHEB.
 2020 - 53 students of Class 12 from General Stream secured A1 grade in the Board Exam taken by GSHEB.
2020 -  44 students of Class 10 secured A1 grade in the Board Exam taken by GSHEB.

List of Ashadeep schools

List of seven Schools of Ashadeep Group of Schools located within the Surat,

References

External links

 Official website

Education in Surat
Private schools in Gujarat
High schools and secondary schools in Gujarat
Educational institutions established in 1997
1997 establishments in Gujarat